A gazebo is a pavilion structure, sometimes octagonal or turret-shaped, often built in a park, garden or spacious public area. Some are used on occasions as bandstands.

Etymology

The etymology given by Oxford Dictionaries is "Mid 18th century: perhaps humorously from gaze, in imitation of Latin future tenses ending in -ebo: compare with lavabo." L. L. Bacon put forward a derivation from Casbah, a Muslim quarter around the citadel in Algiers. W. Sayers proposed Hispano-Arabic qushaybah, in a poem by Cordoban poet Ibn Quzman (d. 1160).

The word gazebo appears in a mid-18th century English book by the architects John and William Halfpenny: Rural Architecture in the Chinese Taste. There Plate 55, "Elevation of a Chinese Gazebo", shows "a Chinese Tower or Gazebo, situated on a Rock, and raised to a considerable Height, and a Gallery round it to render the Prospect more complete."

George Washington had a small eight-sided garden structure at Mount Vernon. Thomas Jefferson wrote about gazebos, then called summerhouses or pavilions.

Design
Gazebos are freestanding or attached to a garden wall, roofed, and open on all sides. They provide shade, shelter from rain and a place to rest, while acting as an ornamental feature. Some gazebos in public parks are large enough to serve as a bandstand.

Types
Gazebos overlap with pavilions, kiosks, alhambras, belvederes, follies, gloriettes, pergolas, and rotundas. 

Such structures first appeared in Egyptian gardens approximately 5,000 years ago and appear in the literature of China, Persia and other classical civilizations.

Examples in England are the garden houses at Montacute House in Somerset. The gazebo at Elton on the Hill in Nottinghamshire, thought to date from the late 18th or early 19th century, is a square, crenelated, brick and stone tower with an arched opening. It acted as a focus for an extensive system of red-brick walled gardens, which has survived with some more modern additions.

In today's England and North America, gazebos are typically built of wood and covered with standard roofing materials, such as shingles. Gazebos can be tent-style structures of poles covered by tensioned fabric. Gazebos may have screens to aid in the exclusion of flying insects.

Temporary gazebos are often set up in the campsites of music festivals in the United Kingdom, Canada and the United States, usually accompanying tents around them.

A structure resembling a gazebo, found in villages in the Maldives, is known as a holhuashi.

Gallery

See also

Gazebo-like structures:
Belvedere
Bandstand
Chickee
Chinese pavilion
Monopteros: a ring of columns, often domed
Pendhapa
Widow's walk

Examples:
 Eric and the Dread Gazebo
 Spring House Gazebo

References

External links

Garden features
Huts